Pimp: The Backhanding  is a card game published in 2005 by Arthaus Games, an imprint of White Wolf Publishing, as part of their One Hit Wonders line. Game design by J.C. Lira, with art by Skottie Young and Brian Glass. Pimp: The Backhanding can be played by two to four players using a single box set, as it contains all the cards and game pieces required, with the exception of dice. Release of Pimp: The Backhanding created some controversy over the game's subject matter by individuals from the White Wolf Publishing Community Forums who felt the game was disrespectful to women and advocated workers in the illegal sex trade industry.

The game represents a media-stereotyped passage of 1970's American pimp culture, with players assuming the roles of typecast pimps who seek consolidation of their criminal holdings and prostitutes to become the largest criminal ring in the city. Score points are symbolized as profit earned from prostitutes peddling their trade.

References

External links
 Official Pimp: The Backhanding website.
 

Card games introduced in 2005
Dedicated deck card games